Edwin Holliday (17 June 1939 – 4 October 2021) was an English professional footballer who played as an outside left.

Early and personal life
Holliday was born in Leeds, or possibly Barnsley, on 17 June 1939. He married in March 1958.

He was cousins with fellow footballers Colin Grainger, Dennis Grainger and Jack Grainger.

Club career
At club level he played for Middlesbrough, Sheffield Wednesday, Hereford United, Workington and Peterborough United before retiring in 1970 due to injury, having scored 38 goals in 284 Football League appearances. He also played for the Football League representative team on one occasion. He retired following a broken leg.

International career
He earned three caps for the England national team in 1959, and also played for England at under-23 level on five occasions.

Later life and death
Holliday died in hometown Barnsley on 4 October 2021, aged 82.

References

1939 births
2021 deaths
English footballers
England international footballers
Middlesbrough F.C. players
Sheffield Wednesday F.C. players
Hereford United F.C. players
Workington A.F.C. players
Peterborough United F.C. players
English Football League players
Association football wingers
England under-23 international footballers
English Football League representative players